Saiful Bari Titu (Bengali: সাইফুল বারী টিটু) is a Bangladeshi football coach and former football player, who was most recently the head coach of Bangladesh Premier League side Chittagong Abahani. He is the former head coach of the Bangladesh national team, which he guided in the AFC Challenge Cup Finals in Colombo, in early 2010. He is an AFC 'A' license holder. He also represented the national team in early 90's.

Coaching career

Early career
He started his coaching career in 2004 as the deputy to Kazi Joshim Uddin Joshi in Mohammedan Sporting. He coached popular Dhaka club Mohammedan for four years. He was also assistant coach in national team, and in 2010 he became head coach of Bangladesh national football team. From September 2010, he is again an assistant coach in the national team, assisting Robert Rubčić. Then he again play the role of head coach in Mohammedan Sporting Club from 2012 to 2013. Later he worked as the team instructor of Bangladesh national football team. In October 2014 the third time he took temporary charge for the representation.

Sheikh Russel
In 2018, Titu joined Sheikh Russel KC ahead of 2018–19 season with record salary after finishing his interim spell at Dhaka Abahani.

On 13 March 2022, Titu was dismissed from the post of Sheikh Russel KC's head coach while his team was standing at relegation zone. It was the end of his longest spell as head coach of his career.

Chittagong Abahani
On 16 October 2022, Titu said that he had a verbal agreement with Chittagong Abahani to take charge as the club's head coach for coming season.

Honours

As a manager
 Mohammedan SC Ltd
 Bangladesh Super Cup: 2011
Sheikh Jamal Dhanmondi Club
 Bangladesh Federation Cup: 2011–12
 Pokhara Cup: 2011

Managerial Statistics

References

External links

1969 births
Living people
Bangladeshi footballers
Footballers from Dhaka
Association football midfielders
Bangladesh international footballers
Asian Games competitors for Bangladesh
Footballers at the 1990 Asian Games
Bangladeshi football managers
Bangladeshi football coaches
Bangladesh Football Premier League managers
Bangladesh national football team managers
Abahani Limited Dhaka managers